The 1940–41 season was Blackpool F.C.'s second season in special wartime football during World War II. They competed in the North Regional League, finishing sixth. 

Jock Dodds was the club's top scorer for the third consecutive season, with 28 goals in all competitions. These don't count in official statistics, however.

References

Blackpool F.C.
Blackpool F.C. seasons